Varadhanayaka is a 2013 Indian Kannada-language action film  Ayyappa P. Sharma and stars Sudeepa, Chiranjeevi Sarja, Sameera Reddy and Nikesha Patel. The film marks the Kannada debut of Sameera Reddy. The film is a remake of Telugu film Lakshyam. Arjun Janya is the music director of the film. Shankare Gowda has produced the venture under Shankar Productions banner.

Plot
In Bangalore. ACP Varadhanayaka lives happily with his parents, wife Lakshmi and younger brother Hari, a college student. A girl named Sirisha comes across Varadhanayaka when she is on a field trip from her college with her friends. She gets friendly with his daughter Pinky. It turns out that Hari studies in Sirisha’s college and soon after they accidentally even come to know each other.

Varadhanayaka investigates the case of a dreaded criminal Section Shankar, who is involved with land dealings which is completely illegal and others including the DIG is involved. When the chairman of the bank who has lent money for the deal demand the money back as the deal hasn’t worked, Shankar eliminates him. The people who are customers of the bank take to the streets and try to damage the bank.

Varadhanayaka arrives there and arrests the manager. Shankar discovers where the manager has been taken. He arrives there with his men and the DIG nearly kill ACP Varadhanayaka. Shankar asks his men to dump the body. On the way, Hari gets involved and ultimately rescues his brother from a burning bus and Varadhanayaka dies in Hari’s arms.

The entire media and the people assume that Varadhanayaka has swindled off all the money as they have been made to believe that by the DIG. Hari seeks vengeance on the people who killed Varadhanayaka, where he kills Siddharth "Siddu" (his friend and Shankar’s brother), and later kills the DIG. Shankar kidnaps Hari's entire family where Hari arrives and kills Shankar, he spills the beans that Varadhanayaka is dead and rescues his family under the supervision of the new DIG, who supports him wholeheartedly.

Cast

 Sudeepa as Varadhanayaka
 Chiranjeevi Sarja as Hari
 Sameera Reddy as Lakshmi, Varadhanayaka's wife
 Nikeesha Patel as Sirisha "Siri"
 P. Ravi Shankar as Section Shankar
 Dr Ambareesh ... (Guest Appearance)
 Sumalatha Ambareesh ... (Guest Appearance)
 Rockline Venkatesh as the new DIG (Guest Appearance)
 Mukhyamantri Chandru as Varadhanayaka and Hari's father
 Jai Jagadish as Siri's father
 Shobaraj as Shankar's PA
 Sharath Lohitashwa as DIG
 J. Karthik as Siddharth "Siddhu", Hari's friend and Shankar's brother
 Sharan as Hari's friend
 Chitra Shenoy
 Padmaja Rao as Varadhanayaka and Hari's mother
 Bullet Prakash
 Dharma
 Satyajit
 Rajiv

Production

Casting
Shankare Gowda, the producer had initially cast Chiranjeevi Sarja to play the main protagonist played by Gopichand in the Telugu version. Later, to reprise the cop role played by Jagapathi Babu in the original version, Gowda approached Sudeepa, his main star in the previous venture Kempegowda. Owing to the success of their previous venture, Gowda decided to give extra screen time for Sudeepa in the new film. Gowda was in search of two leading female stars from the Kannada industry. However, due to date issues, none could be roped in. Actress Priyamani was approached to play the lead but she refused the offer. Finally in July 2011, Nikesha Patel who had just begun her career in Telugu films was cast opposite Sarja in the lead role. Later Kamalinee Mukherjee was approached to play the role opposite Sudeepa. However, she was dropped and later Bollywood actress Sameera Reddy was finally roped in for the role. Director Ayyappa Sharma's brothers Sai Kumar and P. Ravi Shankar were also roped in to play the supporting characters. It was also announced that Arjun Sarja would be doing a cameo appearance in the film.

Filming
As per the initial plans, the film was supposed to go on sets from February 2011. However several delays caused the shooting to regularly commence from 27 June 2011.The filming began  without even casting the leading ladies for the film.

Release
Initially, the film was plan to release on 23, November 2012. The film released in India on 25 January 2013 to mixed reviews. and also Kannada Sangha in Canada released this film in Canada on 28 April 2013

Soundtrack

Arjun Janya has composed 5 songs to the lyrics of Kaviraj and A. P. Arjun.

Reception

Critical response 

GS Kumar of The Times of India scored the film at 3.5 out of 5 stars and says "Chiranjeevi Sarja has done an excellent work in sentimental and action sequences. Sudeepa is at his best as a police officer. It is Ravishankar as rowdy who beats all with brilliant dialogue delivery and body language. Nikesha Patel impresses you as the girl next door. Sameera Reddy, Dharma, Sharath Lohithashwa, Mukhyamanthri Chandru, Sharan and Shobhraj have done justice to their roles. Music by Arjun Janya is a highlight of the movie. Cinematographer Rajesh Kata has done a marvellous job". Srikant Sriniwasa of Rediff.com scored the film at 3 out of 5 stars and says "Arjun Janya’s music is in tune with what the youngsters want to hear. Cinematography by Rajesh Kata is brilliant and Ravi Varma’s stunt sequences are superb. Varadanayaka is a mass entertainer that should be watched for Sudeepa". A critic from News18 India wrote "'Varadanayaka' is a must watch for Kiccha Sudeep's fans, but it will also prove enjoyable for those who like commercial revenge dramas with huge budgets". Shruti I. L. from DNA wrote "As for music, Baite baite... is the only song that will stay with you even after you leave the movie hall. So what’s our verdict? If you are a fan of commercial potboilers then Varadanayaka will make for an ideal weekend watch".

Awards and nominations

3rd South Indian International Movie Awards :-
 Best Actor in a Negative Role - Nominated - P. Ravi Shankar
 Best Music Director - Nominated - Arjun Janya
 Best Playback Singer (Male) - Won - Arjun Janya for the song "Baite Baite"

References

External links
 
 

2013 films
2010s Kannada-language films
Kannada remakes of Telugu films
Films set in Bangalore
Indian action drama films
Films scored by Arjun Janya
2010s masala films
2013 action drama films